Łukasz Kubot and Marcelo Melo were the defending champions, but they were defeated in the second round by Jonathan Erlich and Marcin Matkowski.

Mike Bryan and Jack Sock won the title, defeating Raven Klaasen and Michael Venus in the final, 6–3, 6–7(7–9), 6–3, 5–7, 7–5. It was Bryan's 17th Grand Slam men's doubles title (a new Open Era record), and his first with a partner other than his brother Bob.

Bryan regained the ATP No. 1 doubles ranking at the end of the tournament, becoming the oldest no. 1 player in the history of the ATP rankings.  Mate Pavić, John Peers and Nicolas Mahut were also in contention for the top ranking at the start of the tournament.

Seeds
  Oliver Marach /  Mate Pavić (first round)
  Łukasz Kubot /  Marcelo Melo (second round)
  Henri Kontinen /  John Peers (first round)
  Pierre-Hugues Herbert /  Nicolas Mahut (second round)
  Jamie Murray /  Bruno Soares (quarterfinals)
  Juan Sebastián Cabal /  Robert Farah (third round)
  Mike Bryan /  Jack Sock (champions)
  Nikola Mektić /  Alexander Peya (third round)

  Aisam-ul-Haq Qureshi /  Jean-Julien Rojer (second round)
  Ivan Dodig /  Rajeev Ram (first round)
  Pablo Cuevas /  Marcel Granollers (second round)
  Rohan Bopanna /  Édouard Roger-Vasselin (second round, retired)
  Raven Klaasen /  Michael Venus (final)
  Ben McLachlan /  Jan-Lennard Struff (quarterfinals)
  Dominic Inglot /  Franko Škugor (semifinals)
  Max Mirnyi /  Philipp Oswald (first round)

Qualifying

Draw

Finals

Top half

Section 1

Section 2

Bottom half

Section 3

Section 4

References

External links
 Men's doubles draw
2018 Wimbledon Championships – Men's draws and results at the International Tennis Federation

Men's Doubles
Wimbledon Championship by year – Men's doubles